"Sunday Morning" is a song recorded by the R&B band Earth, Wind & Fire for their album Millennium, and was released as a single by Warner Bros. Records in August 1993. The song reached No. 10 on the US Billboard Adult R&B Songs chart, No. 20 on the US Billboard Hot R&B Singles chart and No. 35 on the US Billboard Adult Contemporary Songs chart. Sunday Morning also reached No. 26 on the Dutch Pop Singles chart and No. 33 on the RPM Canadian Pop Singles chart.

Overview
"Sunday Morning" was produced by Maurice White and arranged by Tom Tom 84. The song was composed by White, Sheldon Reynolds and Allee Willis. The b-side of the single was a track called The L Word. Both Sunday Morning and The L Word also came off EWF's 1993 studio album Millennium. 

With a duration of four minutes and eleven seconds the song has a vivace tempo of 159 bpm.  A music video for the song was also released by Warner Bros. in September 1993.

Critical reception
Billboard described Sunday Morning as a  "midtempo jewel from (EWF's) new Millennium opus", "an excellent way to close the summer season" and a "delicious" tune. Andy Gill of The Independent proclaimed EWF "open in high gear with Even If You Wonder and Sunday Morning" on Millennium. The Buffalo News said in acclaim "Tracks like Sunday Morning and Blood Brothers bring back the EW&F spirit without dragging up carbon copies of past hits".

"Sunday Morning" was also Grammy nominated in the category of Best R&B Vocal Performance by a Duo or Group.

Chart positions

References

1993 singles
1993 songs
New jack swing songs
Earth, Wind & Fire songs
Songs written by Maurice White
Songs written by Allee Willis
Warner Records singles